Sarab-e Key Mirzavandbak (also Romanized as Sarāb-e Key Mīrzāvandbak; also known as Mīrzāvandekī and Sarāb-e Key Hātami) is a village in Dowreh Rural District, Chegeni District, Dowreh County, Lorestan Province, Iran. At the 2006 census, its population was 99, in 20 families.

References 

Towns and villages in Dowreh County